Alfred Satterfield (October 1, 1878 – death unknown), nicknamed "Toad", was an American Negro league second baseman between 1907 and 1913.

A native of Terre Haute, Indiana, Satterfield made his Negro leagues debut in 1907 with the Cuban Giants, and played with the club again in 1908 and 1911. Billed as the "smallest player in the game" and known for his "cut-ups", Satterfield went on to play for the Brooklyn Royal Giants and Indianapolis ABCs through the 1913 season.

References

External links
Baseball statistics and player information from Baseball-Reference Black Baseball Stats and Seamheads

1878 births
Year of death missing
Place of death missing
Brooklyn Royal Giants players
Cuban Giants players
Indianapolis ABCs players
Baseball infielders